Sergio Eduardo Villarreal Romero (born 27 August 1988), known as Sergio Villarreal, is a Colombian former professional footballer who played as a forward.

Career
In February 2011 Villarreal was on trial with American club D.C. United at their preseason camp in California.

References

External links
 

1986 births
Living people
Colombian footballers
Association football forwards
Categoría Primera A players
Deportivo Cali footballers